Enrique Juan José Victoriano Conill y Rafecas (October 1878 – 3 January 1970) was a sailor from Cuba, who represented his country at the 1924 Summer Olympics in Le Havre, France.

References

Sources
 
 

Sailors at the 1924 Summer Olympics – 6 Metre
Olympic sailors of Cuba
Cuban male sailors (sport)
1878 births
1966 deaths
Cuban emigrants to the United States